Rhododendron lowii is a species of rhododendron native to Borneo. It is found in the Crocker Range and Mount Kinabalu of Sabah state, in the northeastern portion of the island.

Description
Rhododendron lowii is a large shrub to a small tree, growing up to ten meters tall. It has the largest flowers of any Bornean rhododendron.

Range and habitat
Rhododendron lowii is found in the Crocker Range and on Mount Kinabalu, where it grows in montane forest and subalpine shrubland from 1,200 to 3,650 meters elevation.

References

lowii
Plants described in 1851
Flora of Sabah
Flora of Mount Kinabalu
Endemic flora of Borneo
Flora of the Borneo montane rain forests